The Shell House is a historic home located at 26 Westland Drive on East Island in Glen Cove in Nassau County, New York.  It was built as a guest cottage and home of the yacht captain on the Matinecock Point Estate of J. P. Morgan, Jr. (1867–1943).  The house is composed of a small, Norman style core dated to the mid-19th century, with a large Tudor Revival addition built about 1910.  Also on the property are the remains of a pier and a poured concrete and cinder block wall.

It was listed on the National Register of Historic Places in 1988. The house was rebuilt in the late-2010s.

References

Glen Cove, New York
Houses on the National Register of Historic Places in New York (state)
Tudor Revival architecture in New York (state)
Houses completed in 1910
Houses in Nassau County, New York
National Register of Historic Places in Nassau County, New York